Alan Barr may refer to:
 Alan Barr (footballer)
 Alan Barr (cricketer)

See also
 Allan David Stephen Barr, British engineer